Farina may refer to:

Places
 Farina, South Australia, a town in Australia
 Farina, Illinois, a village in the United States

People
 Farina (surname)
 Farina (singer), a Colombian reggaeton singer

Fictional characters 
 Farina (Pearls Before Swine), a character in Pearls Before Swine
 Allen "Farina" Hoskins, a character in the Our Gang (Little Rascals) short films
 Farina, a character in Fire Emblem

Other uses
 Farina (food), a cereal meal
 Farina (novel), an 1857 novel by George Meredith
 Farina, a whitish or yellow powdery secretion that appears on leaves of Primula and some ferns. see: Epicuticular wax#Farina

See also 

 
 
 Farina gegenüber, a fragrance company in Cologne, Germany
 Stabilimenti Farina, an Italian coachbuilder
 Pininfarina (disambiguation)
 Farinha (disambiguation)